Boxen is a fictional world that C. S. Lewis ("Jack") and his brother W. H. Lewis ("Warnie") created as children.  The world of Boxen was created when Jack's stories about Animal-Land and Warnie's stories about India were brought together. In Surprised by Joy, Jack explains that the union of Animal-Land and India took place "sometime in the late eighteenth century (their eighteenth century, not ours)".

During a time when influenza was ravaging many families, the Lewis brothers were forced to stay indoors and entertain themselves by reading. They read whatever books they could find, both those written for children and adults. Influenced by Beatrix Potter's animals, C.S. Lewis wrote about Animal-Land, complete with details about its economics, politics/government, and history, as well as illustrations of buildings and characters.

The stories were published posthumously as Boxen: The Imaginary World of the Young C. S. Lewis Edited by Walter Hooper and first published by London: Collins May 28, 1985.  First American edition: San Diego: Harcourt, Brace, Javanovich, October 17, 1985.  (republished as Boxen: Childhood Chronicles Before Narnia).

References

20th-century British children's literature
Fantasy worlds
C. S. Lewis
1985 books
William Collins, Sons books
Books published posthumously